Ayub Mor Silvanos is a Syriac Orthodox Metropolitan of America, Canada, and Europe region of the Knanaya Archdiocese. He was born on April 18, 1972. He received his first four orders of ordination on November 11, 1995, the fifth order on May 27, 1997 and became a full deacon on June 7, 1999. He was ordained as priest on August 6, 1999 by H. E. Mor Clemis Abraham, the Chief Metropolitan of the East.

He completed his pre-degree and graduate courses at Calicut University in Kerala, India and later he joined to study theology at Serampore College, Calcutta, India and obtained Bachelor of Divinity degree (B. D) in 1999. In 2002 he went to Damascus, Syria for Syriac studies and he spent more than a year in St. Ephrem Theological Seminary, Damascus. In 2003, he completed Master of Theology (M.Th) from University of Edinburgh, Scotland. Furthermore, in order to enhance his knowledge and wisdom in Syriac language he joined the Oxford University and successfully completed his Master of Syriac Studies (M. St) in 2005. In 2014 he completed his Doctoral studies and obtained PhD from the University of Manchester, United Kingdom in Liturgical Theology. He is the first Metropolitan obtaining a doctoral degree in the history of the Knanaya Community.

Consecration
In March 2008, the Malankara Suriyani Knanaya Association (MSKA) choose him as new assistant Metropolitan for the Archdiocese and accordingly raised to the order of Ramban in May 2008. Mor Silvanos Ayub was elevated to high priest-hood on June 11, 2008 by Moran Mor Ignatius Zakka I Iwas, the Patriarch of Antioch and All the East and the supreme head of the Universal Syriac Orthodox Church of Antioch. The consecration ceremony was held at the St. Aphrem Church at Ma`arat Seydnaya, Damascus, Syria. Mor Sevarios Kuriakose (Archbishop of Knanaya Archdiocese), Mor Gregorios Kuriakose (Metropolitan of Kallisseri region of the Knanaya diocese), Mor  Timotheos Aphrem Aboodi (former Patriarchal Vicar for Canada), Mor Theophilos George Saliba (Secretary to the Holy Synod) and Mor Clemis Daniel (Lebanon diocese) assisted at the consecration ceremony. The ceremony was attended by a large gathering of Rabans (Monks), Priests, Deacons, Nuns and many faithful from India.

Education
 B.Com. from Calicut University,
 Diploma in Syriac Studies from  St. Aphrem Theological Seminay, Maarat Saidnaya, Syria
 B.D. from Serampore University, Kolkatta,
 M.Th. from Edinburgh University,
 M.St. from Oxford University,
 Ph.D. from Manchester University.

References

Living people
Syriac Orthodox Church bishops
Indian Oriental Orthodox Christians
1972 births